Hurkett is a  dispersed rural community and unincorporated place in the Unorganized part of Thunder Bay District in northwestern Ontario, Canada. It is on Black Bay on the north shore of Lake Superior in geographic Stirling Township, and is on Ontario Highway 582, a short spur off Ontario Highway 17. Hurkett is a designated place served by a local services board, and has a population of 236.

Demographics 

See also

 List of unincorporated communities in Ontario

References

Other map sources:

Communities in Thunder Bay District
Designated places in Ontario
Local services boards in Ontario
Populated places on Lake Superior in Canada